Yury Svirkov (born 20 January 1968) is a Belarusian professional football coach and a former player.

Personal life
He is an older brother of Andrey Svirkov, who is also former professional football goalkeeper. The brothers played alongside each other in a number of teams throughout their careers and also worked together in Spartak Nalchik, until Yury left the team in 2009.

Honours
Neman Grodno
Belarusian Cup winner: 1992–93

MPKC Mozyr
Belarusian Premier League winner: 1996
Belarusian Cup winner: 1995–96

External links

References

1968 births
Living people
Belarusian footballers
Belarus international footballers
Association football goalkeepers
FC Dnepr Mogilev players
FC Neman Grodno players
FC Fandok Bobruisk players
FC Slavia Mozyr players
FC Torpedo Minsk players
FC Khimik Svetlogorsk players
Belarusian football managers
Belarusian expatriate football managers
Expatriate football managers in Russia
Expatriate football managers in Estonia
Expatriate football managers in Ukraine
Belarusian expatriate sportspeople in Russia
Belarusian expatriate sportspeople in Estonia
Belarusian expatriate sportspeople in Ukraine
JK Narva Trans managers
NK Veres Rivne managers
Ukrainian Premier League managers
People from Babruysk
Sportspeople from Mogilev Region